"Must Be Doin' Somethin' Right" is a song written by Marty Dodson and Patrick Jason Matthews and recorded by American country music singer Billy Currington. It was released in May 2005 as the first single from Currington's 2005 album Doin' Somethin' Right. The song became Currington’s first number one hit on the U.S. Billboard Hot Country Songs chart.

Content
The song is a love ballad, set in the key of A major, with a main chord pattern of Fm-D-A on the verses. In it, the narrator says that he "must be doin' somethin' right" in the relationship with his lover.

Critical reception
Stephen Thomas Erlewine of Allmusic wrote that the song "gets a nicely mellow, relaxed Californian vibe".

Chart performance
"Must Be Doin' Somethin' Right" debuted at number 60 on the U.S. Billboard Hot Country Singles & Tracks for the week of June 11, 2005, and peaked at No. 1 on December 31, 2005.  The song has sold 1,282,000 copies in the US as of January 2016.

Year-end charts

Certifications

References

2005 singles
Country ballads
2000s ballads
Billy Currington songs
Song recordings produced by Carson Chamberlain
Mercury Nashville singles
Songs written by Marty Dodson
Songs written by Patrick Jason Matthews
2005 songs